California held its election September 7, 1859. From statehood to 1864, California's members were elected at-large, with the top finishers winning election.

See also 
 1858 and 1859 United States House of Representatives elections
 List of United States representatives from California

1859
California
United States House of Representatives